This Bridge Called My Back: Writings by Radical Women of Color is a feminist anthology edited by Cherríe Moraga and Gloria E. Anzaldúa, first published in 1981 by Persephone Press. The second edition was published in 1983 by Kitchen Table: Women of Color Press. The book's third edition was published by Third Woman Press until 2008, when it went out of print. In 2015, the fourth edition was published by State University of New York Press, Albany.

The book centers on the experiences of women of color and emphasizes the points of what is now called intersectionality within their multiple identities, challenging white feminists who made claims to solidarity based on sisterhood. Writings in the anthology, along with works by other prominent feminists of color, call for a greater prominence within feminism for race-related subjectivities, and ultimately laid the foundation for third wave feminism. It is among the most cited books in feminist theory.

Impact
Though other published writings by women of color existed at the time of This Bridge'''s printing, many scholars and contributors to This Bridge agree that the bringing together of writing by women of color from diverse backgrounds in one anthology made This Bridge unique and influential. Barbara Smith, a contributor, wrote that Black, Native American, Asian American, and Latina women "were involved in autonomous organization at the same time that we [were] beginning to find each other. Certainly This Bridge Called My Back […] has been a document of and a catalyst for these coalitions."

In addition to providing the framework for new activist-based coalitions, This Bridge has had a considerable impact upon the world of academia for its linking of feminism, race, class, and sexuality. It also brought "an intellectual framework" of identities based on race and ethnicity to lesbian and gay studies. In this bridge we call home, the anthology published in 2002 to examine the impacts of This Bridge twenty years later, Australian anthropologist Helen Johnson details This Bridge's effects on institutional teaching environments. She describes how the anthology "has allowed her to offer global perspectives on issues of race, gender, ethnicity, and power against the now antiquated white feminists' utopian ideal of universal sisterhood." This Bridge has been hailed for providing an "easily accessible discourse, plain speaking, a return to Third World storytelling, voicing a difference in the flesh, not a disembodied subjectivity but a subject location, a political and personal positioning."

Though This Bridge is referenced in many essays and books regarding the development of Third World feminism, one of the most widely recognized explorations is Norma Alarcón's essay entitled "The Theoretical Subject(s) of This Bridge Called My Back and Anglo-American Feminism." In her essay, Alarcón discusses the importance of looking at relationships not just between gender groups but within gender groups, as highlighted in This Bridge. Through questioning the existence of objective "truth" as separate from human construction, and through an analysis of language that acknowledges deep contextual and historical meanings, she highlights the intentions of This Bridge to challenge the forces that put all feminists into one category, as well as the oppositional thinking that makes differences hierarchical instead of inter-related and interdependent. Barbara Smith believed that these messages are made clear within the pages of This Bridge, asserting that "more than any other single work, This Bridge has made the vision of Third World feminism real."

However, even with these aforementioned impacts, many individuals contend that women of color feminisms still remain marginal within women's studies in the United States. Chela Sandoval, in her essay on third-world feminism, writes: "The publication of This Bridge Called My Back in 1981 made the presence of U.S. third world feminism impossible to ignore on the same terms as it had been throughout the 1970s. But soon the writings and theoretical challenges of U.S. third world feminists were marginalized into the category of what Allison Jaggar characterized in 1983 as mere 'description.'"This Bridge "offered a rich and diverse account of the experience and analyses of women of color; with its collective ethos, its politics of rage and regeneration, and its mix of poetry, critique, fiction and testimony, it challenged the boundaries of feminist and academic discourse."

Anthologists Moraga and Anzaldúa stated in the preface that they expected the book to act as a catalyst, "not as a definitive statement on Third World Feminism" in the United States. They also expressed a desire to "express to all women, especially white, middle class women, the experiences which divide us as feminists ...we want to create a definition that expands what 'feminist' means."

Teresa de Lauretis noted that This Bridge and All the Women Are White, All the Blacks Are Men, But Some of Us Are Brave: Black Women's Studies (1982) created a "shift in feminist consciousness" by making "available to all feminists the feelings, the analyses, and the political positions of feminists of color, and their critiques of white or mainstream feminism."

Cherríe Moraga, Ana Castillo, and Norma Alarcón adapted this anthology into the Spanish-language Este puente, mi espalda: Voces de mujeres tercermundistas en los Estados Unidos. Moraga and Castillo served as editors, and Castillo and Alarcón translated the text. In 2002, AnaLouise Keating and Gloria Anzaldúa edited an anthology (this bridge we call home: radical visions for transformation) that examined the impact of This Bridge twenty years later while trying to continue the discussion started by Anzaldúa and Moraga in 1981.

Related readings
 All the Women Are White, All the Blacks are Men, But Some of Us Are Brave: Black Women's Studies, edited by Gloria T. Hull, Patricia Bell-Scott, and Barbara Smith (1982)
 Telling to Live: Latina Feminist Testimonios, by the Latina Feminist Group (1993)
 Companeras: Latina Lesbians (An Anthology), edited by Juanita Ramos (1994)
 Making Face, Making Soul/Haciendo Caras: Creative and Critical Perspectives by Women of Color, edited by Glora Anzaldua (1990)this bridge we call home: radical visions for transformation, edited by Gloria Anzaldua and AnaLouise Keating (2002)

Contributors (writers)

Norma Alarcón
Gloria E. Anzaldúa
Toni Cade Bambara
Barbara May Cameron
Andrea Ruth Ransom Canaan
Jo Carrillo
Chrystos
Cheryl Clarke

Combahee River Collective
Gabrielle Daniels
doris davenport
hattie gossett
Aurora Levins Morales
Genny Lim
Naomi Littlebear Morena

Audre Lorde
Cherríe Moraga
Rosario Morales
Judit Moschkovich
Barbara Noda
Pat Parker
Mirtha N. Quintanales
Kate Rushin

Barbara Smith
Beverly Smith
Luisah Teish
Max Wolf Valerio
Nellie Wong
Merle Woo
Mitsuye Yamada

Contributors (artists)

Theresa Hak Kyung Cha
Celia Herrera Rodríguez
Happy/L.A. Hyder
Yolanda M. López
Ana Mendieta
Betye Saar
Hulleah J. Tsinhnahjinnie
Liliana Wilson 

Este Puente, Mi Espalda: Voces de mujeres tercermundistas en los Estados Unidos contributors (artists)

Pilar Agüero
Juana Alicia
Santa Barraza
Marina Gutiérrez
Ester Hernández
Michele Ku
Margo Machida

See also
Chicana feminism
Black feminism
Womanism
Third-world feminismHome Girls: A Black Feminist AnthologyDaughters of AfricaReferences

 Further reading 

 
 
 
 
 

External links

Esta puente, mi espalda: Voces de mujeres tercermundistas en los Estados Unidos, the Spanish translation and adaptation of This Bridge Called My Back''

1981 non-fiction books
Asian-American feminism
African-American feminism
Chicana feminism
English-language books
Literature by African-American women
Literature by Hispanic and Latino American women
Multicultural feminism
Native American feminism
Womanist literature
Radical feminist books
Mexican-American literature
American Book Award-winning works
American anthologies
Black feminist books
Books about race and ethnicity